Durodamus is a genus of spiders in the family Nicodamidae. It was first described in 1995 by Harvey. , it contains only one species, Durodamus yeni, found in Australia.

References

Nicodamidae
Monotypic Araneomorphae genera
Spiders of Australia